Old Boots, New Dirt is the sixth studio album by American country music artist Jason Aldean.  It was released on October 7, 2014 via Broken Bow Records.  Its lead single, "Burnin' It Down", reached the top of the US Hot Country Songs chart during its second week of availability.  The album was produced by Aldean's longtime producer Michael Knox.  The album's second single, "Just Gettin' Started", was released on November 10, 2014. "Tonight Looks Good on You" was released as the album's third single. "Gonna Know We Were Here" was released as the album's fourth single.

A deluxe edition containing three bonus tracks was available exclusively at Target beginning in 2015. Alongside this, a limited edition contained the DVD concert "Night Train to Georgia."

Content
The album's lead single, "Burnin' It Down", was inspired by R&B music. Florida Georgia Line, who co-wrote the song with Rodney Clawson and Chris Tompkins, originally planned on recording "Burnin' It Down" until Aldean expressed interest in the song.

Critical reception

The album received a metacritic score of 54, indicating mixed or average reviews.  Stephen Thomas Erlewine of Allmusic thought the title Old Boots, New Dirt reflected the album's content, saying that "Aldean's boots are getting a bit worn; he's no longer an upstart," nevertheless there were some freshness in the album, with modern electronics accentuating the singer's arena country songs. He judged the album's "casual, almost steely, assurance" made it one of Aldean's best.  Chuck Dauphin of Billboard also thought the album was a mixture of the party songs Aldean is known for, but he "also shows a little bit more of an emotional and sensual side than listeners might be accustomed to".  Jon Caramanica of The New York Times believed that Aldean had fully emerged as a "purveyor of love songs," and excelled at songs like "Show You Off" and "Tryin’ to Love Me".

Jon Dolan of Rolling Stone felt that the album had gone further into pop territory. Jim Casey of Country Weekly also noted the "R&B and pop overtones" of some of the songs. Casey also thought that apart from a few upbeat songs and a "hidden gem" of a song in "Two Night Town", the rest were "ho-hum mid-tempos and ballads that don’t move the meter much in either direction." Marc Hirsh of The Boston Globe considered the album to be "all ambition and no boldness, a solidly constructed modern country album without much in the way of inspiration."

Commercial performance
The album debuted at number 1 on the Billboard 200.  It is Aldean's second album to reach number one on the chart, following his 2012 album Night Train. The album was originally predicted to sell up to 400,000 in its first week in the US, however, it only sold 278,000 copies. On December 8, 2014, the album was officially certified Platinum by the RIAA for shipping over 1 million copies. In July 2015, Old Boots, New Dirt reached its millionth sales mark in the United States. As of November 2016, the album has sold 1,150,200 copies in the US.

In Canada, the album debuted at number 1 on the Canadian Albums Chart, selling 16,000 copies.

Track listing

Personnel
Jason Aldean – lead vocals, background vocals
Kurt Allison – electric guitar
Perry Coleman – background vocals
Shelly Fairchild – background vocals
Marv Green – drum programming 
Tony Harrell – Hammond B-3 organ, keyboards, piano, strings, synthesizer, Wurlitzer
Wes Hightower – background vocals
Mike Johnson – steel guitar, lap steel guitar
Charlie Judge – Hammond B-3 organ
Tully Kennedy – bass guitar
Russ Pahl – steel guitar
Danny Rader – banjo, bouzouki, 12-string guitar, acoustic guitar, hi-string guitar
Rich Redmond – drum programming, drums, percussion
Adam Shoenfeld – e-bow, acoustic guitar, electric guitar
Chris Stapleton – background vocals
Neil Thrasher – background vocals
Chris Tompkins – drum programming

Charts

Weekly charts

Year-end charts

Decade-end charts

Certifications

|}

References

2014 albums
Jason Aldean albums
BBR Music Group albums
Albums produced by Michael Knox (record producer)